Radhames Rodriguez (born October 6, 1992), better known by his stage name Radamiz, is an American rapper from Brooklyn, New York. He is of Dominican descent. Radamiz is a part of the Brooklyn-based collective, Mogul Club. In 2013, he was declared as HOT 97's East Coast "Who's Next" artist and performed at Summer Jam on the festival stage later that year.

Career 

On April 5, 2016, Radamiz was announced as one of the performers at the 2016 Brooklyn Hip-Hop Festival opening up for Nas. Two weeks later he released his debut album, Writeous, which took four years to complete. In October 2016, Radamiz was invited on Statik Selektah's Shade 45 satellite radio show "Showoff Radio" to promote his album.

In May 2018, Radamiz announced his signing to the relaunched Payday Records. That same month he released "V.I.M" produced by V'Don. Radamiz was one of the performers at the 2018 Brooklyn Hip-Hop Festival opening up for Black Star. On September 13, 2018, Radamiz was featured in a billboard and New York City Subway ad campaign in New York City for Depop. Later that month he released a follow up single titled "NYNYNYNY". In January 2019, Radamiz was featured on a FifthGod song titled "Transgression" that included Ab-Soul and Da$H. The following month he released his third single titled "Save The Youth" featuring History & Tedy Andreas.

Discography

Studio albums
Writeous (2016)
Nothing Changes If Nothing Changes (2019)

Mixtapes
The Longer Way Home (2012)
Every Bad Day Has Good News (2021)

EPs
Synonyms of Strength (2020)
Gnashing, Teeth (2023)

Guest appearances

Music videos

Filmography

References

External links 
 
 

1992 births
Living people
American male film actors
American male rappers
American music video directors
American rappers of Dominican Republic descent
Songwriters from New York (state)
East Coast hip hop musicians
Male actors from New York City
New York University alumni
Rappers from Brooklyn
21st-century American rappers
21st-century American male musicians
American male songwriters